Cape Point is a promontory at the southeast corner of the Cape Peninsula, a mountainous and scenic landform that runs north-south for about thirty kilometres at the extreme southwestern tip of the African continent in South Africa. Table Mountain and the city of Cape Town are close to the northern extremity of the same peninsula.

Peaks
The peak above Cape Point is higher than that above the Cape of Good Hope. The rugged sandstone (Table Mountain sandstone) ridge that rises from Cape Point at sea level develops into two peaks. There is a major peak that dominates the skyline locally, but there is also a smaller peak about 100 m (328 ft) further south. The higher peak has the old lighthouse on the top. The Flying Dutchman Funicular runs from a car park to the north up to slightly below the level of the old lighthouse, and a short flight of steps leads to a viewing platform around the base of the lighthouse. From the end of the railway, a second path leads to a lower peak.

Lighthouse

Secondly, foggy conditions often prevail at the higher levels, making the older lighthouse invisible to shipping.

Table Mountain National Park
Cape Point is situated within the Table Mountain National Park, within a section of the park referred to as Cape of Good Hope. This section covers the whole of the southern tip of the Cape Peninsula and which takes in perhaps 20% of its total area. The Cape of Good Hope section of the park is generally wild, unspoiled and undeveloped and is an important haven for seabirds. The vegetation at Cape Point consists primarily of Peninsula Sandstone Fynbos.

Ocean currents

Cape Point is often mistakenly claimed to be the place where the cold Benguela Current of the Atlantic Ocean and the warm Agulhas Current of the Indian Ocean collide. In fact, the meeting point fluctuates along the southern and southwestern Cape coast, usually occurring between Cape Agulhas and Cape Point. The two intermingling currents help to create the micro-climate of Cape Town and its environs. Contrary to popular mythology, the meeting point of the currents produces no obvious visual effect; there is no "line in the ocean" where the sea changes colour or looks different in some way. There are, however, strong and dangerous swells, tides and localized currents around the point and in adjacent waters. These troubled seas have witnessed countless maritime disasters in the centuries since ships first sailed here. 

Fishing is good along the coast but the unpredictable swells make angling from the rocks very dangerous. Over the years scores of fishermen have been swept to their deaths from the rocky platforms by freak waves. False Bay, which opens to the east and north of Cape Point, is the location of the well-known naval port of Simon's Town. The bay is also famous – or infamous – for its great white sharks, which hunt the Cape fur seals that live in the area.

Climate research
Cape Point is the site of one of the Global Atmosphere Watch's atmospheric research stations. In the early years of the 20th century icebergs from Antarctica were occasionally sighted from Cape Point. There have been no authentic recent sightings of ice, which some climatologists and experts have attributed to global warming.

Gallery

References 

Geography of Cape Town
Point
Table Mountain National Park
Tourist attractions in Cape Town